The Woman of My Dreams may refer to: 
 The Woman of My Dreams (1944 film), a German film directed by Georg Jacoby
 The Woman of My Dreams (2010 film), an Italian film starring Alessandro Gassman